Yunzhou District is a district of the city of Datong, Shanxi. It was formerly known as Datong County until 9 February 2018 in a State Council-approved reshuffle of Datong's administrative divisions.

References

www.xzqh.org 

County-level divisions of Shanxi
Datong